Gillian Dewey Boxx (born September 1, 1973) is an American, former collegiate four-time All-American, Gold Medal winning 1996 Olympian, right-handed softball catcher, originally from Torrance, California. She won an Olympic gold medal as a catcher on the United States women's national softball team at the 1996 Summer Olympics in Atlanta, Georgia. Boxx played collegiate softball at the University of California at Berkeley from 1992-95 in the Pac-12 Conference, where she ranks in several records and was a Second Team and three-time First Team All-Conference athlete. She is also the older sister of former United States Women's National Soccer Team midfielder Shannon Boxx.

Statistics

California Golden Bears

Team USA

References

External links
 
 
 

1973 births
Living people
Softball players from California
Olympic gold medalists for the United States in softball
Olympic softball players of the United States
California Golden Bears softball players
People from Fontana, California
Medalists at the 1996 Summer Olympics
Sportspeople from San Bernardino County, California
Softball players at the 1996 Summer Olympics